Porlock Bay is a bay within Dyke Ackland Bay, Oro Province of Papua New Guinea named by Captain John Moresby after Porlock Bay in Somerset, England.

The harbour, known as Porlock Harbour, within the bay was utilised by the American and Australian armed forces as a safe anchorage and supply depot during World War II. A battery of anti-aircraft guns was positioned at Cody's Point.

References

Bays of Papua New Guinea